Mordellistena dentata is a species of beetle in the genus Mordellistena of the family Mordellidae. It was discovered in 1978 by Batten and is native of British Isles.

References

.

dentata
Beetles described in 1978
Beetles of Europe